The 1981 President's Cup Football Tournament was the 11th competition of Korea Cup. The competition was held from 13 to 26 June 1981. South Korea and Racing de Córdoba played out a 2–2 draw and shared the trophy.

Group stage

Group A

Group B

Knockout stage

Bracket

Semi-finals

Third place play-off

Final
The final match originally had to play extra time, but the game was finished early by the agreement between both directors due to a violent atmosphere. The players of Racing de Córdoba received one red and five yellow cards in the final.

See also
Korea Cup
South Korea national football team results

References

External links
President's Cup 1981 (South Korea) at RSSSF

1981